Donald Wayne Barclay III (born April 18, 1989) is a former American football offensive guard. He played college football at West Virginia and was signed by the Green Bay Packers as an undrafted free agent in 2012.

School and college career
Barclay attended Seneca Valley Senior High School in Harmony, Pennsylvania.

He was a three-year starter at left tackle for the Mountaineers. He played in 52 games, and was named fourth-team All-America and first-team All-Big East in 2011 by Phil Steele’s College Football. He also earned second-team All-Big East after starting all 13 games as a junior.

Professional career

Green Bay Packers

After going undrafted in the 2012 NFL Draft, Barclay signed with the Green Bay Packers on May 11, 2012. He earned a spot on the Packers' 53-man roster in 2012. He played in all 16 regular-season games, and started both of Green Bay’s postseason games at right tackle.

Barclay started 15 games for the Packers in 2013, including the NFC Wild Card Game.

Barclay suffered a knee injury in training camp and missed the entire 2014 season.

In 2015, Barclay played in all 16 regular-season games and made five starts. During a Week 16 game against the Arizona Cardinals, Barclay entered the game after David Bakhtiari was injured. However, he had one of the worst games of his career as he allowed four sacks, four QB hurries, and was penalized three times.

Barclay played in all 16 regular-season games and three postseason games in 2016.

On March 10, 2017, Barclay signed a one-year $1.3 million contract with the Packers. He was placed on injured reserve on September 3, 2017. He was released with an injury settlement on October 24, 2017.

Detroit Lions
On October 31, 2017, Barclay signed with the Detroit Lions. He was placed on injured reserve on December 26, 2017 with a concussion.

New Orleans Saints
On July 31, 2018, Barclay signed with the New Orleans Saints. He was released on September 1, 2018.

Denver Broncos
On January 22, 2019, Barclay signed a futures contract with the Denver Broncos. He was released on August 31, 2019.

Personal life
Barclay appeared in the movie Pitch Perfect 2 along with then-teammates.

References

External links

Green Bay Packers bio

1989 births
Living people
Players of American football from Virginia
Sportspeople from Newport News, Virginia
American football offensive guards
American football offensive tackles
West Virginia Mountaineers football players
Green Bay Packers players
Detroit Lions players
New Orleans Saints players
Denver Broncos players